The Canadian Institute for Jewish Research (CIJR) is a think tank based in Montreal and Toronto.  Founded in 1988, its primary goal is to promote Jewish nationalism and Zionism in Canada under the guise of research focused on issues concerning Israel, the Middle East, and international relations.

The Institute's seminars, colloquia, and activities  
The Institute's Insider Briefing seminars and Community Colloquia feature experts on Israel, the Middle East, Jewish history, and  modern Jewish world issues. Speakers have included Yossi Klein Halevi, Stockwell Day, Itamar Marcus, Dan Gillerman, Norman Podhoretz, Irwin Cotler, Steven Emerson, Moshe Ya'alon, James Woolsey,  Alan Baker, and  Isi Leiber.

Student programs 
In 2007, CIJR launched the Student Israel-Advocacy Seminars Program, a year-long training initiative. The Institute's Israel Learning Seminar (ILS) is a year-long training initiative focused on students, but is also open to the public. Given by CIJR Academic Fellows, it is designed to counter what it sees as anti-Semitism and anti-Zionism on campus and in the media.

Baruch Cohen
Baruch Cohen was born in Bucharest. During World War II, Baruch survived pogroms, antisemitism, and forced labor camps in Romania. Many of his family and friends were killed in the Holocaust. After the war, Baruch and his family went to Israel. They subsequently moved to Montreal, where Baruch worked as a financial officer. When he retired, he enrolled in graduate school to pursue a Master's degree in Jewish Studies at Concordia University. He now serves as a full-time volunteer Research Chair at CIJR, which he helped to create. He has conducted research, written, and mentored student interns. Baruch is also an active volunteer with the Montreal Holocaust Memorial Centre, where he has served as a docent and speaker. Twenty years ago, he spearheaded and launched the first Montreal Holocaust, Commemoration in memory of Jews murdered in Romania and Transnistria, which has since become an annual event.

Middle East and Jewish world databank 
The DataBank, an archive of Israel, Middle East, and other materials related to the Jewish-world, is accessible on CIJR's website. Which includes entries on issues ranging from Israeli society and regional politics to international Jewish communities, human rights, and the Holocaust.

Publications

ISRAFAX 
ISRAFAX is the institute's quarterly research print publication. It provides CIJR members with data and a digest of international analysis and opinion on issues, mixing original content with articles from newspapers, magazines, scholarly journals, official documents, and websites from around the world. The Israeli and Arab media are also scanned for reports, opinions, and other documents. The magazine is distributed internationally.

Dateline: Middle East 
Published by the Student Coalition for a Just Peace in the Middle East, Dateline: Middle East is a journal featuring topics regarding Israel, the Middle East, and  the Jewish-world. The journal is made possible by the support of the Canadian Institute for Jewish Research. Appearing several times per year on university and college campuses, it is distributed across Canada, Israel and the United States.  Dateline examines the Middle East and covers issues related to the politics, economics, and cultures of the region from a Zionist perspective.

Israzine 
CIJR's newest publication, Israzine, is a bi-weekly webzine devoted to Israel- and Jewish-world-related political and cultural issues, designed to supplement the Briefings, which group a few pieces around issues of moment, and ISRAFAX, the quarterly print journal.

References 

Jewish organizations based in Canada
Zionism in Canada